Deborah L. Berry (born September 2, 1958) is an American politician who was the Iowa State Representative from the 62nd District from 2012 to 2017. From 2003 to 2012 she represented the 22nd district, most of which is part of the current 62nd district.

Iowa House of Representatives District 62 includes of all the area that is located on the east side and a small part that is on the west side of the Cedar River in Waterloo, Iowa. The incorporated Iowa cities of Evansdale, Elk Run Heights, and  Raymond. Also included is some countryside areas of Black Hawk County. A detailed map is available.

Electoral history
Berry began her official political career in January 2000 whenshe was elected to the Waterloo City Council for the Fourth Ward.

2002 Iowa House of Representatives District 22 Democratic Primary election 
Deborah L. Berry (597 votes)
Joe Rodriguez (422 votes)
Quentin Hart (440 votes)
Melvina B. Scott (346 votes)
2002 Iowa House of Representatives District 22 General Election 
Deborah L. Berry (D) (5071 votes) (66%)
Norm Granger (R) (2589 votes)
2004 Iowa House of Representatives District 22 General Election 
Deborah L. Berry (D) (10,038 votes) (99%) unopposed
write in (109 votes)
2006 Iowa House of Representatives District 22 General Election 
Deborah L. Berry (D) (5,985 votes) (77%)
Michael Anthony (R) (1759 votes)
2008 Iowa House of Representatives District 22 General Election 
Deborah L. Berry (D) (10,081 votes) (99%) unopposed
write in (145 votes)
2010 Iowa House of Representatives District 22 General Election 
Deborah L. Berry (D) (5744 votes) (98%) unopposed  Unofficial Iowa Election Results
write in (115 votes)

Committee membership history 
As Representative for Iowa House District 22
For the 80th General Assembly for the years 2003-2004 
Education
Human Resources
Judiciary
Health & Human Services Appropriations Subcommittee
45 Subcommittee assignments with 24 meetings
For the 81st General Assembly for the years 2005-2006 
Human Resources
Judiciary
Public Safety
Health & Human Services Appropriations Subcommittee
60 Subcommittee assignments with 56 meetings
For the 82nd General Assembly for the years 2007-2008 
Public Safety, Vice Chair
Appropriations
Commerce
Government Oversight
85 Subcommittee assignments with 104 meetings
For the 83rd General Assembly for the years 2009-2010 
Human Resources, Vice Chair
Rebuild Iowa and Disaster Recovery, Vice Chair
Government Oversight
Public Safety
39 Subcommittee assignments with 47 meetings
A member of to the Non-Legislative Commission on the Status of African Americans

Personal life
Berry is a Baptist. She raised one son, Roshawn.

References

External links
Representative Deborah Berry official Iowa General Assembly site
Deborah Berry State Representative official constituency site
 

1958 births
Living people
Politicians from Waterloo, Iowa
University of Northern Iowa alumni
Democratic Party members of the Iowa House of Representatives
Women state legislators in Iowa
African-American state legislators in Iowa
21st-century American politicians
21st-century American women politicians
Iowa city council members
Baptists from Iowa
Women city councillors in Iowa
African-American city council members
21st-century African-American women
21st-century African-American politicians
20th-century African-American people
20th-century African-American women